Gregory Wayne Abbott (born November 13, 1957) is an American politician, attorney, and former jurist serving as the 48th governor of Texas since 2015. A member of the Republican Party, he served as the 50th attorney general of Texas from 2002 to 2015 and as a member of the Texas Supreme Court from 1996 to 2001.

Abbott was the third Republican to serve as attorney general of Texas since the Reconstruction era. He was elected to that office with 57% of the vote in 2002 and reelected with 60% in 2006 and 64% in 2010, becoming the longest-serving Texas attorney general in state history, with 12 years of service. Before becoming attorney general, Abbott was a justice of the Texas Supreme Court, a position to which he was appointed in 1995 by then-governor George W. Bush. Abbott won a full term in 1998 with 60% of the vote. As attorney general, he successfully advocated for the Texas State Capitol to display the Ten Commandments in the 2005 U.S. Supreme Court case Van Orden v. Perry, and unsuccessfully defended the state's ban on same-sex marriage. He was involved in numerous lawsuits against the Barack Obama administration, seeking to invalidate the Affordable Care Act and the administration's environmental regulations.

Elected in 2014, Abbott is the first Texas governor and third governor of a U.S. state to use a wheelchair. As governor, Abbott supported the Donald Trump administration and has promoted a conservative agenda, including measures against abortion such as the Texas Heartbeat Act, lenient gun laws, opposition to illegal immigration, support for law enforcement funding, and election reform. In response to the power crisis following a February 2021 winter storm, Abbott called for reforms to Electric Reliability Council of Texas (ERCOT) and signed a bill requiring power plant weatherization. During the COVID-19 pandemic in Texas, Abbott opposed implementing face mask and vaccine mandates, while blocking local governments, businesses, and other organizations from implementing their own.

Early life, education, and legal career
Abbott was born on November 13, 1957, in Wichita Falls, Texas, of English descent. His mother, Doris Lechristia Jacks Abbott, was a housewife and his father, Calvin Rodger Abbott, was a stockbroker and insurance agent. When he was six years old, they moved to Longview; the family lived there for six years. When he was 12, Abbott's family moved to Duncanville. In his sophomore year in high school, his father died of a heart attack; his mother went to work in a real estate office. Abbott graduated from Duncanville High School, where he was on the track team, in the National Honor Society, and was voted "Most Likely to Succeed".

In 1981, Abbott earned a Bachelor of Business Administration in finance from the University of Texas at Austin, where he was a member of the Delta Tau Delta fraternity and the Young Republicans Club. He met his wife, Cecilia Phalen, while attending UT Austin. In 1984, he earned his Juris Doctor degree from the Vanderbilt University Law School.

Abbott went into private practice, working for Butler and Binion, LLP between 1984 and 1992.

Judicial career
Abbott's judicial career began in Houston, where he served as a state trial judge in the 129th District Court for three years.  Then-Governor George W. Bush appointed Abbott to the Texas Supreme Court; he was then twice elected to the state's highest civil court—in 1996 (two-year term) and in 1998 (six-year term). In 1996, Abbott had no Democratic opponent but was challenged by Libertarian John B. Hawley of Dallas. Abbott defeated Hawley, 84% to 16%. In 1998, Abbott defeated Democrat David Van Os, 60% to 40%.

In 2001, after resigning from the Supreme Court, Abbott returned to private practice and worked for Bracewell & Giuliani LLC. He was also an adjunct professor at University of Texas School of Law.

Attorney General of Texas

2002 election
Abbott resigned from the Texas Supreme Court in 2001 to run for lieutenant governor of Texas. He had been campaigning for several months when the previous attorney general, John Cornyn, vacated the post to run for the U.S. Senate. Abbott then switched his campaign to the open attorney general's position in 2002. He defeated the Democratic nominee, former Austin mayor and former state senator Kirk Watson, 57% to 41%. Abbott was sworn in on December 2, 2002, following Cornyn's election to the Senate.

Tenure
Abbott expanded the attorney general's office's law enforcement division from about 30 people to more than 100. He also created a new division, the Fugitive Unit, to track down convicted sex offenders in violation of their paroles or probations.

In 2003, Abbott supported the Texas Legislature's move to cap non-economic damages for medical malpractice cases at $250,000, with no built-in increases for rising cost of living.

In a 2013 speech to fellow Republicans, when asked what his job entails, Abbott said: "I go into the office in the morning, I sue Barack Obama, and then I go home." Abbott filed 31 lawsuits against the Obama administration, including suits against the Environmental Protection Agency; the U.S. Department of Health and Human Services, including challenges to the Affordable Care Act ("Obamacare"); and the U.S. Department of Education, among many others. According to The Wall Street Journal, from Abbott's tenure as attorney general through his first term as governor, Texas sued the Obama administration at least 44 times, more than any other state over the same period; court challenges included carbon-emission standards, health-care reform, transgender rights, and others. The Dallas Morning News compared Abbott to Scott Pruitt, noting that both attorneys general had repeatedly sued the federal government over its environmental regulations. The Houston Chronicle noted that Abbott "led the charge against Obama-era climate regulations".

Abbott has said that the state must not release Tier II Chemical Inventory Reports for security reasons, but that Texans "can ask every facility whether they have chemicals or not". Koch Industries has denied that its contributions to Abbott's campaign had anything to do with his ruling against releasing the safety information.

In March 2014, Abbott filed a motion to intervene on behalf of Baylor Scott & White Medical Center – Plano in three federal lawsuits against the hospital, brought by patients who alleged that the hospital allowed Christopher Duntsch to perform neurosurgery despite knowing that he was a dangerous physician. Abbott cited the Texas legislature's cap on malpractice cases and the statute's removal of the term "gross negligence" from the definition of legal malice as reasons for defending Baylor.

In the late 2000s, Abbott established a unit in the attorney general's office to pursue voter-fraud prosecutions, using a $1.4 million federal grant; the unit prosecuted a few dozen cases, resulting "in small fines and little or no jail time". The office found no large-scale fraud that could change the outcome of any election.

Lawsuit against Sony BMG

In late 2005, Abbott sued Sony BMG. Texas was the first state in the nation to bring legal action against Sony BMG for illegal spyware. The suit is also the first filed under the state's spyware law of 2005. It alleges the company surreptitiously installed the spyware on millions of compact music discs (CDs) that consumers inserted into their computers when they played the CDs, which can compromise the systems. On December 21, 2005, Abbott added new allegations to his lawsuit against Sony-BMG. He said the MediaMax copy protection technology violated Texas's spyware and deceptive trade practices laws. Sony-BMG offered consumers a licensing agreement when they bought CDs and played them on their computers; in the lawsuit, brought under the Consumer Protection Against Computer Spyware Act of 2005 and other laws, Abbott alleged that even if consumers rejected that agreement, spyware was secretly installed on their computers, posing security risks for music buyers and deceiving Texas purchasers. Sony settled the Texas lawsuit, as well as a similar suit brought by California's attorney general, for $1.5 million.

Separation of church and state

In March 2005, Abbott delivered oral argument before the United States Supreme Court on behalf of Texas, defending a Ten Commandments monument on grounds of the Texas State Capitol. Thousands of similar monuments were donated to cities and towns across the nation by the Fraternal Order of Eagles, who were inspired by the Cecil B. DeMille film The Ten Commandments (1956) in following years. In his deposition, Abbott said, "The Ten Commandments are a historically recognized system of law." The Supreme Court held in a 5–4 decision that the Texas display did not violate the First Amendment's Establishment Clause and was constitutional. After Abbott's oral arguments in Van Orden v. Perry, Justice John Paul Stevens commented upon Abbott's performance while in a wheelchair, "I want to thank you [...] for demonstrating that it's not necessary to stand at the lectern in order to do a fine job."

Guns
As attorney general, Abbott opposed gun control legislation. In 2013, he criticized legislation enacted by New York State strengthening its gun regulation laws by expanding an assault weapons ban and creating a high-capacity magazine ban; he also said he would sue if Congress enacted a new gun-control bill. After the law passed, Abbott's political campaign placed Internet ads to users with Albany and Manhattan ZIP codes suggesting that New York gun owners should move to Texas. One ad read, "Is Gov. Cuomo looking to take your guns?", and the other read, "Wanted: Law abiding New York gun owners looking for lower taxes and greater opportunity." The ads linked to a letter on Facebook in which Abbott wrote that such a move would enable citizens "to keep more of what you earn and use some of that extra money to buy more ammo".

In February 2014, Abbott argued against a lawsuit brought by the National Rifle Association (NRA) to allow more people access to concealed carry of firearms, as he felt this would disrupt public safety.

Tort reform 
Abbott backed legislation in Texas to limit "punitive damages stemming from noneconomic losses" and "noneconomic damages in medical malpractice cases" at $750,000 and $250,000, respectively. While the settlement in his own paralysis case was a "nonmedical liability lawsuit", which remains uncapped, Abbott has faced criticism, generally from Democrats who oppose the Republican-backed lawsuit curbs, for "tilt[ing] the judicial scales toward civil defendants."

Support for ban on sex toys
As attorney general, Abbott unsuccessfully defended Texas's ban on sex toys. He said Texas had a legitimate interest in "discouraging prurient interests in autonomous sex and the pursuit of sexual gratification unrelated to procreation."

Opposition to same-sex marriage
As attorney general, Abbott defended the state's ban on same-sex marriage from a constitutional challenge. In 2014, he argued in court that Texas should be allowed to prohibit same-sex marriage because LGBT individuals cannot procreate. He said that as "same-sex relationships do not naturally produce children, recognizing same-sex marriage does not further these goals to the same extent that recognizing opposite-sex marriage does." He also argued that gay people are still free to marry, saying they are "as free to marry an opposite-sex spouse as anyone else". He suggested that same-sex marriage led to slippery slope where "any conduct that has been traditionally prohibited can become a constitutional right simply by redefining it at a higher level of abstraction."

2006 election
In the November 7, 2006, general election, Abbott was challenged by civil rights attorney David Van Os, who had been his Democratic opponent in the 1998 election for state Supreme Court. He was reelected to a second term with 60% to Van Os's 37%.

2010 election
Abbott ran for a third term in 2010. He defeated the Democratic nominee, attorney Barbara Ann Radnofsky, with 64% of the vote to her 34%. He was the longest-serving Texas attorney general in Texas history.

In July 2013, the Houston Chronicle alleged improper ties and oversight between many of Abbott's largest donors and the Cancer Prevention and Research Institute of Texas, of which he was a director.

Gubernatorial elections

2014

 
In July 2013, shortly after Governor Rick Perry announced that he would not seek a fourth full term, Abbott announced his candidacy for governor of Texas in the 2014 election. In the first six months of 2011, he raised more money for his campaign than any other previous Texas politician, reaching $1.6 million. The next-highest fundraiser among state officeholders was Texas comptroller Susan Combs, with $611,700.

Abbott won the Republican primary on March 4, 2014, with 91.5% of the vote. He faced State Senator Wendy Davis in the general election.

Abbott promised to "tie outcomes to funding" for pre-K programs if elected, but said he would not require government standardized testing for 4-year-olds, as Davis accused him of suggesting. When defending his education plan, Abbott cited Charles Murray: "Family background has the most decisive effect on student achievement, contributing to a large performance gap between children from economically disadvantaged families and those from middle class homes." A spokesman for Abbott's campaign pointed out that the biggest difference in spending was that Davis had proposed universal pre-K education while Abbott wanted to limit state funding to programs that meet certain standards. Davis's plan could reach $750 million in cost and Abbott said that her plan was a "budget buster", whereas his education plan would cost no more than $118 million. Overall, Abbott said the reforms he envisioned would "level the playing field for all students [and] target schools which don't have access to the best resources." He called for greater access to technology in the classroom and mathematics instruction for kindergarten pupils.

Abbott received $1.4 million in campaign contributions from recipients of the Texas Enterprise Fund, some of whose members submitted the proper paperwork for grants.  Elliot Nagin of the Union of Concerned Scientists observed that Abbott was the recipient of large support from the fossil fuels industries, such as NuStar Energy, Koch Industries, Valero Energy, ExxonMobil, Chevron, and ConocoPhillips. Abbott was endorsed by the Fort Worth Star-Telegram, the Dallas Morning News, the Lubbock Avalanche-Journal and the Tyler Morning Telegraph. He and his running mate for lieutenant governor, Dan Patrick, were endorsed by the National Rifle Association and received their 'A' rating.

Abbott defeated Davis by over 20 percentage points in the November general election.

2018 election

 

Lieutenant Governor Dan Patrick had been mentioned as a potential challenger, but confirmed that he would run for reelection as lieutenant governor. During the weekend of January 21, 2017, Abbott said that he intended to run for reelection. He confirmed this on March 28, 2017.

Abbott formally announced his reelection campaign on July 14, 2017. This came four days before the start of a special legislative session that could split the Republican Party into factions favoring Abbott and Patrick on one hand and House speaker Joe Straus on the other. Straus represented the Moderate Republican faction, which opposes much of the social conservative agenda Abbott and Patrick pursued.

In the November 6 general election, Abbott defeated Democratic nominee Lupe Valdez with about 56% of the vote, having outraised her 18 to 1. He received 42% of the Hispanic and 16% of the African American vote.

2022 election

 

Abbott ran for a third term and faced challengers from within his own party, including former Texas Republican Party chair Allen West and Don Huffines. On March 1, he won the primary with over 66% of the vote. He was challenged by the Democratic nominee, former U.S. Representative Beto O'Rourke. Abbott began with a large campaign funding advantage over his opponents, but was outraised by O'Rourke, who raised $81.6 million to Abbott's $78.5 million.

Abbott defeated O'Rourke, 54% to 43%, becoming the fifth Texas governor to serve three terms, after Allan Shivers, Price Daniel, John Connally and Rick Perry. He won 68% of Anglos, 18% of African Americans, and 42% of Latinos.

Tenure as governor

Abbott was sworn in as governor of Texas on January 20, 2015, succeeding Rick Perry. He is the first governor of Texas and the third elected governor of a U.S. state to use a wheelchair, after Franklin D. Roosevelt of New York (1929–1932) and George Wallace of Alabama (1963–1967, 1971–1979; 1983–1987).

Abbott held his first meeting as governor with a foreign prime minister when he met with the Irish Taoiseach Enda Kenny on March 15, 2015, to discuss trade and economic relations.

During the 2015 legislative session, initiated by officials at the Texas Health and Human Services Commission, the Texas legislature placed a rider to cut $150 million from its budget by ending payments and coverage for various developmental therapies for children on Medicaid. A lawsuit was filed against the state on behalf of affected families and therapy providers, claiming the cut could cause irreparable damage to the affected children's development. The litigation obtained a temporary injunction order on September 25, 2015, barring THHSC from implementing therapy rate cuts.

During Donald Trump's presidency, Abbott ardently supported Trump. The Trump administration appointed several former Abbott appointees to federal courts, which some media outlets attributed to Abbott's influence on the administration. In 2021, Trump endorsed Abbott for reelection, choosing him over several Republican primary rivals who also positioned themselves as pro-Trump.

Abbott's book Broken But Unbowed (2016) recounted Abbott's personal story and views on politics.

In October 2016, explosive packages were mailed to Abbott, President Obama, and the Commissioner of the Social Security Administration. Abbott's package did not explode when he opened it because “he did not open [the package] as intended”.

On June 6, 2017, Abbott called for a special legislative session in order to pass several of his legislative priorities, an agenda supported by Lieutenant Governor Dan Patrick. Abbott vetoed 50 bills in the regular 2017 session, the most in a session since 2007.

Abbott appointed multiple judges to various judgeships, including several GOP-affiliated judges who had recently lost local judicial elections.

After the regular 2021 session, The New York Times called Abbott and Patrick "the driving force behind one of the hardest right turns in recent state history". Other sources said Abbott and other state officials advanced strongly conservative policies.

Abortion 

In November 2016, the State of Texas, at Abbott's request, approved new rules that require facilities that perform abortions either to bury or cremate the aborted, rather than dispose of the remains in a sanitary landfill. The rules were intended to go into effect on December 19, but on December 15 a federal judge blocked them from going into effect for at least one month after the Center for Reproductive Rights and other advocacy groups filed a lawsuit. On January 27, 2017, a federal judge ruled against the law, but the State of Texas vowed to appeal the ruling.

On June 6, 2017, Abbott signed a bill into law banning dismemberment and partial-birth abortions and requiring either burial or cremation of the aborted. That law was also blocked by a federal judge; the state said it would appeal.

On May 18, 2021, Abbott signed the Texas Heartbeat Act, a six-week abortion ban, into law. In September 2021, he signed into law a bill preventing women from mail-ordering abortion medication seven weeks into pregnancy.

Convention of States proposal 

In 2016, Abbott spoke to the Texas Public Policy Foundation, calling for a Convention of States to amend the U.S. Constitution. In his speech, he proposed the Texas Plan, a series of nine new amendments to "unravel the federal government's decades-long power grab "to impose fiscal restraints on the federal government and limit the federal government's power and jurisdiction." The plan would limit the power of the federal government and expand states' rights, allowing the states to nullify federal law under some circumstances.

On January 8, 2016, Abbott called for a national constitutional convention to address what he saw as abuses by justices of the United States Supreme Court in "abandoning the Constitution." Speaking to the Texas Public Policy Foundation, Abbott said, "We the people have to take the lead to restore the rule of law in the United States." Abbott elaborated on his proposal in a public seminar at the Hoover Institute on May 17, 2016.

Criminal justice 
In the wake of the George Floyd protests, Abbott called on candidates in the 2020 elections to "back the blue." In response to actions by some Texas cities to redirect funding from police to social services and emergency response, he threatened that the state of Texas would seize control of the local police departments. In 2021, Abbott spearheaded legislative efforts to financially penalize cities in Texas that reduce spending on police.

In 2021, Abbott vetoed a bipartisan criminal justice bill that would have made people convicted of certain crimes before the age of 18 eligible for early parole and created panels to consider inmates' age and mental status at the time of their crimes when evaluating parole eligibility. He also vetoed legislation to prohibit police from using statements made under hypnosis in criminal court. He also vetoed an animal protection bill that would have made it illegal to chain up dogs without giving them access to drinkable water and shade or shelter.

Firearms 
In 2015, Abbott signed the campus carry (SB 11) and the open carry (HB 910) bills into law. The campus carry law came into effect later that year, allowing licensed carrying of a concealed handgun on public college campuses, with private colleges able to opt out. The open carry bill went into effect in 2016,  allowing the licensed open carrying of handguns in public areas and private businesses that do not display a 30.07 sign. The 30.07 sign (referring to state penal code 30.07) states that a handgun may not be carried openly even by a licensed gun carrier. To do so openly is considered trespassing. Texas is the 45th state to have open carry. In 2017, Abbott signed into law a bill lowering handgun carry license fees. In 2021, he signed into law a bill that allowed Texans to carry guns without a license.

In an interview with Fox News following the November 5, 2017, Sutherland Springs church shooting, Abbott urged historical reflection and the consideration that evil had been present in earlier "horrific events" during the Nazi era, the Middle Ages and biblical times. The Anti-Defamation League called his comparison of the shooting "to the victims of the Holocaust" "deeply offensive" and "insensitive".

After the 2018 Santa Fe High School shooting, Abbott said that he would consult across Texas in an attempt to prevent gun violence in schools. A series of round-table discussions followed at the state capitol. In a speech to a NRA convention in Dallas almost two weeks later, Abbott said, "The problem is not guns, it’s hearts without God". In June 2019, he signed a bill allowing for more armed teachers, with school districts unrestricted as to the number they allow. The creation of "threat assessment teams", passed into law by the bill, is intended to identify potentially violent students. Although the state legislature passed measures for students services to deal with related mental health issues, proposals to adopt a red flag law failed. Abbott said such a law was "not necessary in the state of Texas."

In August 2019, a gunman who had written a racist manifesto killed 22 people in a mass shooting at a Wal-Mart in El Paso, saying he had targeted "Mexicans". After the shooting, Abbott convened a domestic terrorism task force to look into domestic extremism, but reiterated his opposition to a red-flag law and rejected calls to convene a special session of the state legislature to address gun violence.

From September 1, 2021, Texans are able to carry handguns without a license or training after Abbott signed a permitless carry bill into law in June 2021.

On May 24, 2022, Abbott said that an 18-year-old carrying a handgun and possibly a rifle (later identified as an Daniel Defense DDM4, an AR-15-style semi-automatic rifle) killed 19 students and 2 teachers at the Robb Elementary School in Uvalde. On May 25, Abbott held a news conference to give further information on the shooting. Gun laws were not mentioned. Abbott said that mental health in the community was the root cause of the event. Beto O’Rourke, who was running for the Democratic nomination for governor in 2022, approached the stage and said, "The time to stop the next shooting is right now and you are doing nothing." Abbott responded that it was a time for "healing and hope" for the victim's families, not "our agendas." Rather than attend the annual NRA meeting on May 27, Abbott published a YouTube message. He did not mention the sale of assault rifles, but said that gun laws have not been effective, noting that the shooter broke two gun laws the day he committed the multiple murders. It is a felony to possess a gun on school property, and "what he did on campus is capital murder. That's a crime that would have subjected him to the death penalty in Texas", Abbott said.

Jade Helm 15 

On April 28, 2015, Abbott asked the State Guard to monitor the training exercise Jade Helm 15 amid Internet-fueled suspicions that the war simulation was really a hostile military takeover. In 2018, former director of the CIA and NSA Michael Hayden said that Russian intelligence organizations had propagated the conspiracy theory and that Abbott's response convinced them of the power such a misinformation campaign could have in the United States.

Religion 
In 2015, Abbott signed the Pastor Protection Act, which allows members of the clergy to refuse to marry same-sex couples if they feel doing so violates their beliefs.

In 2017, Abbott signed into law Senate Bill 24, preventing state or local governments from subpoenaing pastors' sermons. The bill was inspired by an anti-discrimination ordinance in Houston, where five pastors' sermons were subpoenaed.

Also in 2017, Abbott signed House Bill 3859, which allows faith-based groups working with the Texas child welfare system to deny services "under circumstances that conflict with the provider's sincerely held religious beliefs." Democrats and civil rights advocates said the adoption bill could allow such groups to discriminate against those who practice a different religion or who are lesbian, gay, bisexual, or transgender, and LGBT rights groups said they would challenge the bill in court. In response, California added Texas to a list of states to which it banned official government travel.

Immigration 

In November 2015, Abbott announced that Texas would refuse Syrian refugees following the Paris terrorist attack that occurred earlier that month. In December 2015, Abbott ordered the Texas Health and Human Services Commission to sue the federal government and the International Rescue Committee to block refugee settlement, but a federal district court struck the lawsuit down.

On February 1, 2017, Abbott blocked funding to Travis County, Texas, due to its recently implemented sanctuary city policy. On May 7, 2017, he signed into law Texas Senate Bill 4, targeting sanctuary cities by charging county or city officials who refuse to work with federal officials and allowing police officers to check the immigration status of those they detain.

In January 2020, Abbott made Texas the first state to decline refugee resettlement under a new rule implemented by the Trump administration. In a joint statement, all 16 Catholic bishops of Texas condemned the move.

In 2021, Abbott referred to undocumented immigrants crossing the border as an "invasion." In March 2021, he tweeted, "The Biden Administration is recklessly releasing hundreds of illegal immigrants who have COVID into Texas communities." PolitiFact rated Abbott's claim "Mostly False", since those being released were asylum seekers with a legal right to remain in the U.S., and the number was well below "hundreds", only 108, at the time of Abbott's tweet.

In June 2021, Abbott ordered Texas child-care regulators to take the licenses of child-care facilities that housed unaccompanied migrant minors. He said that housing unaccompanied minors in child-care facilities had a negative impact on facilities housing Texan children in foster care. Later that month, he announced plans to build a border wall with Mexico, saying that the state would provide $250 million and that direct donations from the public would be solicited.

In July 2021, Abbott advised state law enforcement officers to begin arresting illegal migrants for trespassing. On July 27, 2021, he ordered the National Guard to begin helping arrest migrants, and the next day he signed an order to restrict the ground transportation of migrants. Migrants arrested under Abbott's policy were imprisoned for weeks without legal help or formal charges.

In 2021, Abbott announced that Texas would continue the U.S. Border Wall started by Donald Trump. The wall is the same design Trump used and is under construction.

On April 7, 2022, Abbott announced in a press conference a plan to direct the Texas Division of Emergency Management to bus illegal immigrants with 900 charter buses from Texas to Washington D.C, citing the potential surge of immigrants who would cross the border after Title 42 provisions regarding communicable disease were set to be rolled back by President Biden the next month. Any mayor, county judge, or city could request buses for immigrants who had been released from federal custody. After initial criticism, Abbott clarified that the trip would be voluntary for immigrants. On April 13, the first bus, carrying 24 immigrants, arrived in Washington D.C after 30 hours. A second bus arrived the next day. Abbott came under fire for both buses, with one American Enterprise Institute scholar suggesting Abbott be federally prosecuted for human trafficking. Senator Ted Cruz supported Abbott's actions and advocated for more immigrants to be bused into other predominantly Democratic areas. In a press conference, White House press secretary Jen Psaki said it was "nice" that Texas was "helping them get to their final destination as they await the outcome of their immigration proceedings". Washington D.C. mayor Muriel Bowser responded to the influx of migrants from Texas by requesting National Guard support for what she termed a "migrant crisis."

On September 15, 2022, Abbott sent two buses with 101 mostly Venezuelan migrants detained after crossing the U.S. border with Mexico to the residence of Vice President Kamala Harris, at the Naval Observatory in Washington, D. C. In Caracas Chronicles, Rafael Osío Cabrices compared Abbott's tactics to those of Aleksander Lukashenko, who provoked a migrant crisis in the European Union Eastern border as a reprisal to criticism, and Fidel Castro, who released common criminals and mental health patients during the 1980 Mariel boatlift and shipped them to the United States. On September 17, Abbott sent another bus with 50 migrants to Harris's residence.

Border issues 
In early April 2022, Abbott announced that Texas would increase inspections of commercial trucks entering from Mexico with the goal of seizing illegal drugs and illegal migrants. Shortly thereafter, the inspections caused a multi-mile backup of commercial vehicles carrying produce, auto parts, household goods and many other items. A spokesman for the Fresh Produce Association of the Americas said that up to 80% of perishable fruits and vegetables had been unable to cross and in some cases were in danger of spoiling. The president of the Texas Trucking Association said the delays were affecting every kind of trucking and being felt across the country. Mexican truckers blockaded several bridges in protest. Under heavy pressure from Texas business owners, who strongly criticized the "secondary inspections", Abbott canceled the policy on April 15. He said the reversal was because the governors of adjacent Mexican states had agreed to exercise stronger vigilance against human trafficking, drugs, and guns.

Abbott's truck inspections ultimately cost Texas an estimated $4.2 billion and led to no apprehensions of drugs or illegal migrants.

Environment 

, Abbott rejects the scientific consensus on climate change. He has said that the climate is changing, but does not accept the consensus that human activity is the main reason.

In early 2014, Abbott participated in sessions held at the headquarters of the United States Chamber of Commerce to devise a legal strategy to dismantle climate change regulations. In 2016, he supported Scott Pruitt's appointment as head of the Environmental Protection Agency (EPA), saying, "He and I teamed up on many lawsuits against the EPA." As Texas attorney general, Abbott often sued the federal government over environmental regulations.

After Joe Biden was elected president, Abbott vowed to pursue an aggressive legal strategy against the Biden administration's environmental regulations.

Voting rights 

Abbott pressed for a purge of nearly 100,000 registered voters from Texas voter rolls. Texas officials initially claimed that the voters to be purged were not American citizens. The purge was canceled in April 2018 after voting rights groups challenged the purge, and officials at the Office of the Texas Secretary of State admitted that tens of thousands of legal voters (naturalized citizens) were wrongly flagged for removal. Abbott claimed that he played no role in the voter purge, but emails released in June 2019 showed that he was the driving force behind the effort.

In September 2020, Abbott issued a proclamation that each Texas county could have only one location where voters could drop off early voting ballots. He justified the decision by claiming it would prevent "illegal voting" but cited no examples of voter fraud. Election security experts say voter fraud is extremely rare. Also in September 2020, Abbott extended the early voting period for that year's general election due to COVID-19; the Republican Party of Texas opposed his decision.

Abbott made "election integrity" a legislative priority after President Trump's failed attempts to overturn the election results of 2020 United States presidential election by using baseless claims that the results were fraudulent. Voting rights advocates and civil rights groups denounced the resulting legislation, saying it disproportionately affected voters of color and people with disabilities.

In July 2021, Democratic lawmakers in the Texas legislature fled the state on a chartered flight to Washington, D.C. in an effort to block the passage of a bill that would reform the state election procedures. Abbott threatened to have the lawmakers arrested upon their return to Texas. In August, the Supreme Court of Texas made a ruling allowing for the arrest of the absent lawmakers, so they could be brought to the state capitol.

In October 2021, Abbott appointed John Scott as Texas Secretary of State, putting him in a position to oversee Texas elections. Scott aided Trump in his failed efforts to throw out election results in the 2020 presidential election.

LGBT rights 
In 2014, Abbott defended Texas's ban on same-sex marriage, which a federal court ruled unconstitutional. As attorney general of Texas, he argued that the prohibition on same-sex marriage incentivized that children would be born "in the context of stable, lasting relationships."

Abbott condemned Obergefell v. Hodges, the Supreme Court ruling that same-sex marriage bans are unconstitutional. He said, "the Supreme Court has abandoned its role as an impartial judicial arbiter." Shortly thereafter, Abbott filed a lawsuit to stop same-sex spouses of city employees from being covered by benefit policies.

In a letter dated May 27, 2017, the CEOs of 14 large technology companies, including Facebook, Apple, Microsoft, and Amazon, urged Abbott not to pass what came to be known as the "bathroom bill": legislation requiring people to use the bathroom of the sex listed on their birth certificates, not the one of their choice. The bill was revived by Abbott and supported by Lieutenant Governor Dan Patrick. In March 2018, Byron Cook, the chairman of the House State Affairs committee who blocked the bill, claimed that Abbott privately opposed the bill. The bill was never signed; Abbott later said, "it's not on my agenda" in a debate with Lupe Valdez, the Democratic nominee for governor in 2018.

In 2017, Abbott signed legislation to allow taxpayer-funded adoption agencies to refuse same-sex families from adopting children for religious reasons.

In 2021, a Republican primary challenger criticized Abbott because Texas’s child welfare agency included content regarding LGBTQ youths. Shortly thereafter, the agency, whose members Abbott appoints, removed the webpage that included a suicide prevention hotline and other resources for LGBT youths.

In 2022, Abbott instructed Texas state agencies to treat gender-affirming medical treatments (such as puberty blockers or hormone treatments) for transgender youths as child abuse.

Homelessness 
In June 2019, the city of Austin introduced an ordinance that repealed a 25-year-old ban on homeless people camping, lying, or sleeping in public.  In October 2019, Abbott sent a widely publicized letter to Austin Mayor Steve Adler criticizing the camping ban repeal and threatened to deploy state resources to combat homelessness.

In November 2019, Abbott directed the State of Texas to open a temporary homeless encampment on a former vehicle storage yard owned by the Texas Department of Transportation, which camp residents dubbed "Abbottville".

Marijuana 
In 2019, when numerous local prosecutors announced that they would stop prosecuting low-level marijuana offenses, Abbott instructed them to continue enforcing marijuana laws. The prosecutors cited recently passed legislation that legalized hemp. As hemp contains the same chemical as marijuana, THC, tests at law enforcement's disposal cannot distinguish between marijuana usage and hemp usage. Abbott has said that legal hemp products come with a "hemp certificate".

In 2022, a poll of Texas voters found that 55% of Texans either support or strongly support legalizing cannabis.

COVID-19 pandemic 

During the COVID-19 pandemic, Abbott issued a stay-at-home order from April 2 to May 1, 2020. This was one of the shortest stay-at-home orders implemented by any governor. After Texas started to reopen, COVID-19 surged, leading Abbott to pause the reopening. On June 24, Texas broke its record of new COVID-19 cases in a day. Critics described Abbott's pause as a half-measure and argued that he should reverse the reopening in full to limit the virus's spread.

According to The New York Times, Abbott's response to the pandemic has been contradictory, as he has said that Texans should stay at home while also saying that Texas is open for business. He also said that Texans should wear face masks but refused to issue a statewide mandate. Abbott's response to the pandemic has been criticized on both sides of the political spectrum. In July 2020, he directed counties with more than 20 COVID-19 cases to wear masks in public places; he had previously prohibited local governments from implementing required face masks.

In December 2020, Abbott directed Texas restaurants to ignore local curfews that had been imposed to prevent the spread of COVID-19. Localities had implemented restrictions on indoor dining and drinking late at night on New Years weekend amid a surge in COVID-19 cases.

On March 2, 2021, Abbott lifted all COVID-19 restrictions in Texas, which included ending a mask mandate and allowing businesses to reopen "100 percent."

In April 2021, Abbott signed an executive order banning state agencies and corporations that take public funding from requiring proof of vaccination against COVID-19. In June 2021, he signed a bill that would punish businesses that require customers to have proof of COVID-19 vaccination for services.

On May 18, 2021, Abbott issued an executive order banning mask mandates in public schools and governmental entities, with up to a $1,000 fine for non-compliers.

On August 17, 2021, Abbott's office announced that he had tested positive for COVID-19 despite being fully vaccinated since December 2020. According to his office, Abbott was "in good health and experiencing no symptoms". He received Regeneron's monoclonal antibody treatment.

Abbott emphasized personal responsibility over government restrictions, and resolutely opposed government mandates in August 2021. On July 29, 2021, during an again worsening pandemic, he issued a superseding executive order (GA-38) that reinstated earlier orders and imposed additional prohibitions on local governmental officials, state agencies, public universities, and businesses doing business with the state, to prohibit them from adopting measures such as requiring face masks or proof of vaccination status as a condition of service. The order also provides for a $1,000 fine for local officials who adopt inconsistent policies. President Biden criticized Abbott for these measures. The ban on mask mandates led to a score of legal challenges between Abbott and local governments, including school districts. In justifying the ban on local government mandates in August 2021, an Abbott spokesperson said, "Private businesses don't need government running their business." In October 2021, Abbott issued an executive order that banned any entity, including a private business, from implementing a vaccine requirement for its employees.

February 2021 North American ice storm 

During the February 13–17, 2021 North American winter storm, power-plant failures across Texas left four million households in Texas without power. Abbott called for investigation and reform of the Electric Reliability Council of Texas (ERCOT), the electric grid operator for most of Texas.

On February 16, on Hannity, Abbott said, "This shows how the Green New Deal would be a deadly deal for the United States of America ... Our wind and our solar got shut down, and they were collectively more than 10 percent of our power grid, and that thrust Texas into a situation where it was lacking power on a statewide basis... It just shows that fossil fuel is necessary." The Texas energy department of the state of Texas immediately clarified that "most of Texas's energy losses came from failures to winterize the power-generating systems, including fossil fuel pipelines." Most power plants in Texas are gas-fired, with wind generators providing about 10% during the winter.

By February 18, Abbott had ordered Texas natural gas to sell exclusively to power generators in Texas, which had an immediate and direct impact on Mexico, where gas-fired plants generate two-thirds of all energy.

In June 2021, Abbott signed a bill requiring power companies to be more prepared for extreme weather events.

Personal life 

Abbott, a Catholic, is married to Cecilia Phalen Abbott, the granddaughter of Mexican immigrants. They were married in San Antonio in 1981. His election as governor of Texas made her the first Latina to be First Lady of Texas since Texas joined the union. They have one adopted daughter, Audrey. Cecilia is a former schoolteacher and principal.

Wheelchair use 
On July 14, 1984, at age 26, Abbott was paralyzed below the waist when an oak tree fell on him while he was jogging after a storm. Two steel rods were implanted in his spine, and he underwent extensive rehabilitation at TIRR Memorial Hermann in Houston and has used a wheelchair ever since. He sued the homeowner and a tree service company, resulting in an insurance settlement that provided him with lump sum payments every three years until 2022 along with monthly payments for life; both are adjusted for inflation. As of August 2013, the monthly payment was 14,000 and the three-year lump sum payment was 400,000, all tax-free. Abbott has said he relied on the money to pay for nearly three decades of medical expenses and other costs.

Electoral history
On November 4, 2014, Abbott defeated Wendy Davis by 20 points in the Texas gubernatorial election. According to exit polls, he received 44% of the Hispanic vote and 50% of Hispanic men, a majority (54%) of female voters, and 62% of the votes of married women (75% of women in Texas are married).

2022

2018

2014

2010

2006

2002

1998

References

Further reading
 Gonzalez, John W. "Abbott has friends and foes in disabled community." Houston Chronicle. July 29, 2013.

External links

 Governor Greg Abbott Official state website
 
 
 

|-

|-

|-

|-

|-

|-

|-

1957 births
Living people
20th-century American lawyers
21st-century American politicians
21st-century Roman Catholics
American male non-fiction writers
American people of English descent
American political writers
American politicians with disabilities
Catholics from Texas
Catholic politicians from Texas
Duncanville High School alumni
Republican Party governors of Texas
Justices of the Texas Supreme Court
McCombs School of Business alumni
People from Duncanville, Texas
People from Wichita Falls, Texas
Politicians from Houston
Politicians with paraplegia
Texas Attorneys General
Texas lawyers
Vanderbilt University Law School alumni
Wheelchair users